Heterogynis canalensis is a moth in the Heterogynidae family. It was described by Thomas Algernon Chapman in 1904. The Global Lepidoptera Names Index reports it as a synonym of Heterogynis penella.

References

Heterogynidae
Moths described in 1904